Monodontides chapmani is a butterfly of the family Lycaenidae. It is found on Buru in Indonesia.

References

, 2003. New information on lycaenid butterflies of the South-East Asian Islands. Transactions of the Lepidopterological Society of Japan, 54(2): 73-82. PDF

Monodontides
Butterflies described in 2003